2008–09 FIS Alpine Ski Europa Cup was the 38th season of the FIS Alpine Ski Europa Cup.

Standings

Overall

Downhill

Super G

Giant Slalom

Slalom

Super combination

Indoor Cup

Men's podium finishes

Downhill

Super G

Giant Slalom

Slalom

Super combination

Indoors 

The results of both races were added and points were awarded for this overall ranking according to the FIS point system.

Podium finishes women

Downhill

Super G

Giant Slalom

Slalom

Super combination

Indoors 

The results of both races were added and points were awarded for this overall ranking according to the FIS point system.

References

External links
 

FIS Alpine Ski Europa Cup